"Roll with It" is a song by English rock band Oasis, written by lead guitarist Noel Gallagher. It was released on 14 August 1995 as the second single (the lead single being "Some Might Say") from their second studio album (What's the Story) Morning Glory? (1995).

In a highly publicised chart battle with Blur's single "Country House" dubbed "The Battle of Britpop," "Roll with It" reached number 2 on the UK Singles Chart.

The song was described by American music critic Stephen Thomas Erlewine as, "an assured stadium rocker that unabashedly steals the crown from Status Quo".

'Battle' with Blur
"Roll with It" received a great deal of attention when Food Records, the label of Britpop rivals Blur, moved the original release date of the single "Country House" to beat it on the charts, sparking what came to be known as "The Battle of Britpop". The British media had already reported an intense rivalry between the two bands and this clash of releases was seen as a battle for the number one spot. The media sensation was spurred on by verbal attacks from the respective camps (in particular Noel and Liam Gallagher, Damon Albarn and Alex James), that extended beyond the music industry to the point where the two bands were regularly mentioned on the evening news. In particular, public imagination was sparked by the contrast between the "working class" Oasis and the "middle class" Blur. In the end, Blur's "Country House" single sold 274,000 copies to Oasis' 216,000 copies of "Roll with It". The singles charted at number 1 and number 2 respectively.

In 2019, Noel Gallagher reflected on the battle on Dermot O'Leary's Reel Stories, dismissing both songs as "shit". He suggested that a chart race between Oasis's "Cigarettes & Alcohol" and Blur's "Girls & Boys" would have had greater merit: "'Roll With It' has never been played by anybody since the band split up".

Top of the Pops performance
When Oasis played "Roll with It" on British chart show Top of the Pops on 17 August 1995, they were required to mime the song, and in doing so the Gallagher brothers switched roles with Liam pretending to play guitar and Noel pretending to sing (equipped with Liam's tambourine).

Marketing
The single artwork features a photograph of the band on the beach at Weston-super-Mare. Many potential locations were examined along the Somerset and Avon coastline (Oasis were playing Glastonbury that weekend, so a beach within striking distance of the festival site had to be found).

Themes
The song is like several other Oasis songs, such as "Supersonic", in that it preaches the importance of being oneself.

Uses
The song had made it back into Oasis' live set-list, being played on their 2009 stadium tour.

When Manchester City won the FA Cup final in 2011, "Roll with It" was played through the PA of Wembley Stadium. It has since been played at the end of most of the home games at the Etihad Stadium.

The song was used by Team England (Phil Taylor and Adrian Lewis) as their walk-on music at the 2012 PDC World Cup of Darts.

The melody for this song also appears in part in The Lemonheads' song "Purple Parallelogram", which was co-written between Noel Gallagher and Evan Dando .

The song's chorus is frequently played as background music for the Fox Sports English Premier League adverts in Australia.

"Roll with It" is regularly played after matches at Celtic Park.

"Roll with It" featured at the end of the Red Nose Day 2015 sketch titled "Who's Got What It Takes to Be a National Treasure", which featured a cameo appearance from Liam Gallagher who was made a National Treasure by Stephen Fry, Miranda Hart and Sheridan Smith.

In Mexico was used for a 1997 CONACULTA TV Spot.

Track listing

UK CD single 
 "Roll with It"
 "It's Better People"
 "Rockin' Chair"
 "Live Forever" (Live at Glastonbury '95)

UK 7-inch single 
A. "Roll with It"
B. "It's Better People"

UK 12-inch single 
A1. "Roll with It"
B1. "It's Better People"
B2. "Rockin' Chair"

UK cassette single 
 "Roll with It"
 "It's Better People"

Australian CD single 
 "Roll with It"
 "Talk Tonight"
 "Acquiesce"
 "Headshrinker"

 "Headshrinker" was a B-side of the band's previous UK single "Some Might Say" and was one of the last tracks to feature original Oasis drummer Tony McCarroll.
 "Live Forever" was recorded live at the Glastonbury Festival on 23 June 1995.

Personnel
 Liam Gallagher – lead vocals, tambourine
 Noel Gallagher – lead guitar, acoustic guitar, backing vocals
 Paul Arthurs – rhythm guitar
 Paul McGuigan – bass guitar 
 Alan White – drums, percussion

Charts and certifications

Weekly charts

Year-end charts

Certifications

References

1995 singles
1995 songs
Creation Records singles
Number-one singles in Scotland
Oasis (band) songs
Song recordings produced by Noel Gallagher
Songs written by Noel Gallagher